Federal Route 260, or Jalan Pasir Mas-Pohon Tanjung (formerly Kelantan State Route D24), is a federal road in Kelantan, Malaysia. The road connects Pasir Mas in the east to Pohon Tanjung in the west.

History
In 2014, the highway was gazetted as Federal Route 260.

Features

Kilometre zero

List of junctions and towns

References

Malaysian Federal Roads